Now Bagh (also Romanized as Now Bāgh) is a village in Miyan Jovin Rural District, Helali District, Joghatai County, Razavi Khorasan Province, Iran. At the 2006 census, its population was 778, in 167 families.

References 

Populated places in Joghatai County